Granheim is a surname. Notable people with the surname include:

Asbjørn Granheim (1906–1977), Norwegian politician
Else Granheim (1926–1999), Norwegian librarian and civil servant
Tormod Granheim (born 1974), Norwegian adventurer and motivational speaker 

Norwegian-language surnames